The Beach Hotel was a seasonal resort in Galveston, Texas. Designed by architect Nicholas J. Clayton, it was built in 1882 at a price of US$260,000 (US$ in today's terms) to cater to vacationers. Owned by William H. Sinclair, the hotel opened on July 4, 1883, and was destroyed by a mysterious fire in 1898.

The front lawn of the beach hotel "provided a site for summer entertainment-fireworks, high-wire walkers, and bands."

Specifications 
The -story hotel was built atop 300 cedar piles driven into the sand. The roof had an octagonal dome, which housed the water tanks, and was painted in large red and white stripes, and the eaves were trimmed in a golden green.

Amenities 
The following were some of the attributes of the hotel.
 Dining room
 Gentlemen's parlor
 Reading room
 Saloon
 Grand staircase
 Electric and gas lighting

Sewage 

In 1898, the Beach Hotel was discovered to have been flushing its cesspools via pipe into the Gulf of Mexico. The city health official regarded this practice as "absolutely disgusting and disgraceful" and refused to allow the hotel to open until it connected to the city's sewage system. In the interim before the hotel connected, it mysteriously burned down.

Fire 

The hotel was destroyed by fire lasting 25 minutes in 1898. The fire trucks had a problem reaching the hotel because of the beach's sand. The cause of the fire was never determined. At least one musician was reported dead from the incident.

References

History of Galveston, Texas
Hotels established in 1882
Hotel buildings completed in 1882
Defunct hotels in Texas
Burned hotels in the United States
1882 establishments in Texas
1898 disestablishments in Texas
Buildings and structures demolished in 1898